World Ultimate is the first studio album by American hip hop group The Nonce. It was released by American Recordings and Wild West Records on February 28, 1995. "Bus Stops" peaked at number 44 on the Billboard Hot Rap Songs chart.

Critical reception

Glen Sansone of CMJ New Music Monthly stated that "World Ultimate tips its cap to both L.L. Cool J and MC Shan, while joining loose, outgoing B-Boy posturing with old-school beats jacketed in an ethereal coating, as on 'Mix Tapes.'" Steve Huey of AllMusic wrote, "Occasionally, the duo can get a little too relaxed, but on the whole it's an engaging alternative to the standard West Coast gangsta fare." Matt Welty of Complex commented that "MCs Nouka Basetype (who would later go by Sach) and Yusef Afloat came together with their conscious perspectives to rap over jazzy instrumentation about everything from taking the bus to the issues plaguing hip-hop."

In 2012, Fact included the album on the "Most Overlooked Hip-Hop LPs of the 90s" list.

Track listing

Personnel
Credits adapted from liner notes.

The Nonce
 Nouka Basetype – vocals, production, cover concept
 Yusef Afloat – vocals, production, cover concept

Additional personnel
 Aceyalone – additional vocals (3)
 Butta B. – additional vocals (4)
 Meen Green – additional vocals (4)
 Figures of Speech – background vocals (9)
 Sean Freehill – recording
 Tom Coyne – mastering
 Morris "Mo" Taft – executive production, cover concept
 Aldo Sampieri – art direction
 Susan Goines – cover photography
 Dorothy Low – inside folder photography

References

External links
 

1995 debut albums
The Nonce albums
American Recordings (record label) albums